James Langstaff Bowman,  (October 6, 1879 – September 14, 1951) was the first Speaker of the House of Commons of Canada from Manitoba.

Bowman had been a teacher and lawyer in Dauphin, Manitoba. In 1917, he became the town's mayor. He ran unsuccessfully in the 1925 and 1926 general elections for the Conservative Party. He finally winning a seat in the 1930 election that brought R.B. Bennett to power.

He became Speaker after his predecessor, George Black, suffered a nervous breakdown in the summer of 1934, and was unfit to preside when the House of Commons of Canada reconvened in January 1935.

As the Deputy Speaker was ill, Bennett approached Bowman, a backbencher, hours before the House was to convene, about becoming Speaker for the rest of the Parliamentary term.

Bowman had little experience as Speaker and had to deal with a tense, pre-election session. Members of Parliament on all sides of the House felt that Bowman did well in the job. But when the 1935 general election was held in the fall, Bowman lost his seat by a large margin.

He returned to his law practice in Dauphin and failed in his attempt to regain his seat in the 1940 election.

James Bowman was named to the team that represented the Manitoba Curling Association at the 1932 Winter Olympics. That year, curling was a demonstration sport. Bowman was third for the team which took first place in the event. The Manitoba team was undefeated, winning all four of its games at the Olympics. In 2004, the team was inducted into the Manitoba Sports Hall of Fame.

References

External links

1879 births
1951 deaths
Members of the House of Commons of Canada from Manitoba
Conservative Party of Canada (1867–1942) MPs
Speakers of the House of Commons of Canada
Lawyers in Manitoba
Members of the King's Privy Council for Canada
Canadian sportsperson-politicians
Canadian people of German descent
Mayors of Dauphin, Manitoba
Canadian male curlers
Curlers from Manitoba
Curlers from Ontario
Olympic curlers of Canada
Olympic gold medalists for Canada
Curlers at the 1932 Winter Olympics
Medalists at the 1932 Winter Olympics
20th-century Canadian people